The 2015–16 Creighton Bluejays women's basketball team will represent Creighton University in the 2015–16 college basketball season. The Bluejays, led by thirteenth year head coach Jim Flanery and were members of the Big East Conference. The Bluejays play their home games at D. J. Sokol Arena. They finished the season 17–18, 8–10 in Big East to finish in a tie for seventh place. They advanced to the championship game of the Big East women's tournament where they lost to St. John's. They were invited to the Women's National Invitation Tournament where they lost to South Dakota in the first round.

Roster

Schedule

|-
!colspan=9 style="background:#0C5FA8; color:#FFFFFF;"|Exhibition

|-
!colspan=9 style="background:#0C5FA8; color:#FFFFFF;"| Non-conference regular season

|-
!colspan=9 style="background:#0C5FA8; color:#FFFFFF;"| Big East regular season

|-
!colspan=9 style="background:#0C5FA8; color:#FFFFFF;"| Big East Women's Tournament

|-
!colspan=9 style="background:#0C5FA8; color:#FFFFFF;"| WNIT

See also
2015–16 Creighton Bluejays men's basketball team

References

Creighton
Creighton Bluejays women's basketball seasons
Creighton Bluejays
Creighton Bluejays